NV (pronounced as envy) is a 26-story residential high-rise in the Pearl District in Portland, Oregon. Formerly known as The Overton, the  tower opened in 2016.

History
Plans for a 26-story apartment building at the site, to be called The Overton, were announced in November 2012. The city approved the design in April 2014. Demolition of a warehouse on the site began in July 2014. Construction on the tower began in August 2014 by developer Unico Properties. The construction process was complicated by the fact that the contractor was building two other residential towers adjacent to NV. The residential high-rise opened in September 2016.

Features
The first two floors contain retail space, with the rest of the  tower consisting of 284 apartments. It has 271 spaces of underground parking, and the structure uses a concrete shear wall design. The project was developed by Seattle's Unico Properties and constructed by Andersen Construction, with the design by ZGF Architects. A large terrace sits on top of the retail portion of the structure, with the residential tower occupying the rest of platform. The tower is rotated by 45-degrees in order to allow residents enhanced views.

See also

 List of tallest buildings in Portland, Oregon

References

External links
 

2016 establishments in Oregon
Apartment buildings in Portland, Oregon
Pearl District, Portland, Oregon
Residential buildings completed in 2016
Residential skyscrapers in Portland, Oregon